Mavinakere Srinivasayyangar Cheluvayyangar better known by his stage name Sampath was an Indian actor in the Kannada film industry. Some of the notable films of Sampath as an actor include Gandhada Gudi (1973), Sri Srinivasa Kalyana (1974), Bhakta Kumbara (1974) and Eradu Kanasu (1974).

Career
Sampath  has been part of more than 130 films in Kannada. His combinations in films, with actor Dr.Rajkumar gained popularity.

Selected filmography

 Bharathi (1949)
 Dallali (1952)
 Chintamani (1957)
 Nakkare Ade Swarga (1967)
 Dhana Pishachi (1967)...Rama Rao
 Sarvamangala (1968)
 Margadarshi (1969)...Chennayya
 Mallammana Pavaada (1969)...landlord
 Madhura Milana (1969)
 Gejje Pooje (1969)
 Rangamahal Rahasya (1970)
 Paropakari (1970)...Veeranna
 Devara Makkalu (1970)...Krishnaswamy
 Thayi Devaru (1971)...Paramashivayya
 Sothu Geddavalu (1971)...Rao Bahadur Shivarudrappa
 Nyayave Devaru (1971)
 Sri Krishna Rukmini Satyabhama (1971)
 Kula Gourava (1971)...Thimme Gowda
 Baala Bandana (1971)...Chandrashekhar Rao
 Nari Munidare Mari (1972)...Seetharamaiah
 Uttara Dakshina (1972)
 Bidugade (1973)...Sadashiva Rao
 Onde Roopa Eradu Guna (1975)
 Mayura (1975)...Veerasharma
 Daari Tappida Maga (1975)
 Katha Sangama (1976)
 Premada Kanike (1976)
 Badavara Bandhu (1976)
 Naa Ninna Mareyalare (1976)...Mohan Rao
 Olavu Geluvu (1977)
 Shani Prabhava (1977)
 Bhagyavantharu (1977)
 Babruvahana (1977)
 Shankar Guru (1978)...Gurumurthy
 Huliya Haalina Mevu (1979)...Somaiah
 Havina Hede (1981)
 Jeevakke Jeeva (1981)...Lakshman Rao
 Hosa Belaku (1982)

References

External links 
 

Male actors in Kannada cinema
Indian male film actors
Male actors from Karnataka
20th-century Indian male actors
1983 deaths
Place of death missing
1904 births